The 2005–06 Minnesota Golden Gophers men's basketball team represented the University of Minnesota in the college basketball season of 2005–2006. The team's head coach, Dan Monson, was in his seventh season with the Gophers and the team played their home games at Williams Arena in Minneapolis, Minnesota and are members of the Big Ten Conference.

Season
After making the NCAA tournament the previous year, the Gophers had mixed results throughout the season.  The team was able to win only two games on the road, but defeated three top 20 teams at home in conference play.  After losing to eventual conference tournament winner Iowa, the Gophers accepted an invitation to the NIT where they would give their home fans one final win before being defeated on the road by Cincinnati in the second round.

Roster

2005–06 Schedule and results

|-
! colspan="6" style="text-align: center; background:#800000" | Exhibition 

|-
! colspan="6" style="text-align: center; background:#800000"|Regular Season 

|-
! colspan="6" style="text-align: center; background:#800000"|Big Ten Regular Season 

|-
! colspan="6" style="text-align: center; background:#800000"|2006 Big Ten tournament

|-
! colspan="6" style="text-align: center; background:#800000"|2006 National Invitation tournament

Rankings

The 2005–06 Minnesota Golden Gophers basketball team was not ranked during the season.

References

Minnesota Golden Gophers men's basketball seasons
Minnesota
Minnesota
Minnesota Golden Gophers men's b
Minnesota Golden Gophers men's b